The 2nd Individual European Artistic Gymnastics Championships for both men and women took place in Amsterdam in April 2007.

Nations
Participating nations included:

 Albania        
 Belarus        
 Belgium        
 Bulgaria       
 Czech Republic 
 France         
 Germany        
 Great Britain  
 Greece         
 Hungary        
 Iceland        
 Israel         
 Italy          
 Lithuania      
 Portugal       
 Romania        
 Russia         
 Spain          
 Sweden         
 Ukraine

Medal winners

Men's results

Individual all-around

Floor exercise

Pommel horse

Rings

Vault

Parallel bars

Horizontal bar

Women's results

Individual all-around

Vault

Uneven bars

Balance beam

Floor exercise

Medal Count

Combined

Men

Women

References 

 
 
 

2007
2007 in European sport
2007 in Dutch sport
International gymnastics competitions hosted by the Netherlands
2007 in gymnastics